Wonderful Terrific Monds Jr. (born May 3, 1952) is a former American football defensive back who played one season with the San Francisco 49ers of the National Football League (NFL). His unusual name was originally given to his father when, after his grandparents had several girls, a son was finally born and his father thought it was "wonderful, just terrific."

Monds attended Fort Pierce Central High School in Fort Pierce, Florida and played college football at the University of Nebraska–Lincoln. He was drafted by the Pittsburgh Steelers in the fourth round of the 1976 NFL Draft. He was also a member of the Ottawa Rough Riders team that won the 64th Grey Cup.

Monds is the father of former NFL defensive tackle Mario Monds. Another son, Wonderful Terrific Monds III, was a Minor League Baseball player.

References

External links
Just Sports Stats
Nebraska Cornhuskers profile
Fanbase profile
Monds family

Living people
1952 births
Players of American football from Florida
American football defensive backs
Canadian football defensive backs
African-American players of American football
African-American players of Canadian football
Nebraska Cornhuskers football players
Ottawa Rough Riders players
San Francisco 49ers players
People from Fort Pierce, Florida
21st-century African-American people
20th-century African-American sportspeople